Flavobacterium is a genus of Gram-negative, nonmotile and motile, rod-shaped bacteria that consists of 130 recognized species.  Flavobacteria are found in soil and fresh water in a variety of environments. Several species are known to cause disease in freshwater fish.

Flavobacterium psychrophilum causes the bacterial cold water disease on salmonids and the rainbow trout fry disease on rainbow trout.
F. columnare causes the cotton-wool disease on freshwater fishes.
F. branchiophilum causes the bacterial gill disease on trout.  Another member of this genus, F. okeanokoites is the original source for the type IIs restriction endonuclease FokI, used in Zinc finger nucleases and TALENs.

Nylon-eating bacteria are a strain of Flavobacterium that is capable of digesting certain by-products of nylon 6 manufacture.

Species who are a part of the genus Flavobacterium are most likely found scattered along in nature. These microbes are mostly found in aquatic ecosystems and wet areas with freshwater or seawater. The Flavobacterium species are in most if not all cases found in some type of hypersaline water which is very halotolerant of the Antarctic species of [F.] gondwanense and [F.] salegens Which are the most important members of Flavobacteriaceae.

Species
The genus Flavobacterium comprises the following species:

F. acidificum
F. aciduliphilum
F. acidurans
F. agri
F. agrisoli
F. ahnfeltiae
F. ajazii
F. album
F. algicola
F. alkalisoli
F. ammonificans
F. ammoniigenes
F. amnicola
F.amnigenum
F. anatoliense
F. anhuiense
F. antarcticum
F. aquaticum
F. akiainvivens
F. aquariorum
F. aquatile
F. aquicola
F. aquidurense
Flavobacterium aquimarinumF. aquimarinum
F. araucananum
F. arcticum
F. arsenatis
F. arsenitoxidans
F. aurantiibacter
F. aureus
F. banpakuense
F. baculatum
F. beibuense
F. bernardetii
F. bizetiae
F. bomense
F. bomensis
F. branchiarum
F. branchiicola
F. branchiophilum
F. breve
F. brevivitae
F. buctense
F. caeni
F. caseinilyticum
F. cauense
F. cellulosilyticum
F. ceti
F. cerinum
F. cheniae
F. cheongpyeongense
F. cheonanense
F. cheonhonense
F. chilense
F. chryseum
F. chungangense
F. chungbukense
F. chungnamense
Flavobacterium circumlabensF. circumlabens
F. collinsense
F. collinsii
F. columnare
F. compostarboris
F. commune
F. coralii
F. covae
F. crassostreae
F. croceum
F. crocinum
F. cucumis
F. cupreum 
F. cutihirudinis
F. cyanobacteriorum 
F. daejeonense
F. daemonensis
F. dankookense
F. dasani
F. dauae
F. davisii
F. defluvii
F. degerlache
F. denitrificans
F. devorans
F. difficile
F. dispersum
F. dongtanense
F. eburneum
F. endophyticum
F. endoglycinae
F. enshiense
F. faecale
F. ferrugineum
F. filum
F. flaviflagrans
F. flevense
F. fluviale
F. fluviatile
F. fluvii
F. fontis
F. franklandianum
F. frigidarium
F. frigidimaris
F frigoris
F. fryxellicola
F. fulvum
F. gelidilacus
F. gawalongense
F. gillisiae
F. ginsengisoli
F. ginsenosidimutans
F. glaciei
F. glycines
F. granuli
F. halmophilum
F. hankyongi
F. haoranii
F. hauense
F. hercynium
F. hibernum
F. hiemivividum
F. humi
F. humicola
F. hydatis
F. hydrocarbonoxydans
F. hydrophilum
F. ichthyis
F. indicum
F. inkyongense
F. inviolabile      
F. jejuense
F. jocheonensis 
F. johnsoniae
F. jumunjinense
F. kingsejongi
F. knui
F. koreense
F. kyungheense
F. lacicola
F. lacunae
F. lacus
F. laiguense
F. limicola
F. limnosediminis
F. lindanitolerans
F. longum
F. lotistagni
F. luticocti
F. lutivivi
F. macrobrachii
F. magnum 
F. maotaiense
F. marinum
F. maris
F.microcysteis 
F. micromati
F. mizutaii
F. muglaense
F. myungsuense
F. multivorum
F. nackdongense
F. naphthae 
F. nitratireducens
F. nitrogenifigens
F. niveum
F. noncentrifugens
F. notoginsengisoli
F. oceanosedimentum
F. omnivorum
F. oncorhynchi
F. okeanokoites
F. orientale
F. oreochromis
F. oryzae
F. panici
F. palustre
F. paronense
F. parvum
F. pectinovorum
F. pedocola
F. petrolei
F. phocarum
F. phragmitis
F. phycosphaerae
F. piscinae
F. piscis
F. plurextorum
F. pokkalii 
F. ponti
F. procerum
F. profundi
F. psychrolimnae
F. psychrophilum
F. psychroterrae
F. psychrotolerans 
F. qiangtangense
F. rakeshii
F. ranwuense
F. reichenbachii
F. resistens
F restrictum
F. rhamnosiphilum
Flavobacterium riviphilumF. riviphilum
F. rivuli
F. saccharophilum
F. saliperosum
F. salilacus
F. salmonis
F. sandaracinum
F. sangjuense
F. sasangense
F. segetis

F. sediminilitoris
F. sediminis
F. selenitireducens
F. seoulense
F. sharifuzzamanii
F. silvaticum
F. silvisoli
F. sinopsychrotolerans
F. soli
F. solisilvae 
F. spartansii
F. squillarum
F. stagni
F. suaedae
F. subsaxonicum
F. succinans
F. suncheonense
F. supellecticarium
F. suzhouense
F. swingsii
F. tagetis
F. tangerina
F. tangerinum
F. tegetincola
F. terrae
F. terrigena
F. terriphilum
F. thermophilum
F. tiangeerense
F. tibetense
F. tilapiae
F. tistrianum
F. tructae
F. tyrosinilyticum
F. ummariense
F. undicola
F. ureilyticum
F. urocaniciphilum
F. urumqiense
F. verecundum
F. vireti
F. viscosum
F. weaverense
F. xanthum
F. xinjiangense
F. xueshanense
F. yanchengense
F. yonginense
F. zaozhuangense
F. zepuense
F. zettnowii	
F. zhairuonense
F. zhairuonensis

References

 
Bacterial diseases of fish
Gram-negative bacteria
Bacteria genera
Bacteria described in 1923